The 1998 Masters (officially the 1998 Benson & Hedges Masters) was a professional non-ranking snooker tournament that took place between 1 and 8 February 1998 at the Wembley Conference Centre in London, England.

The final frame of final between Mark Williams and Stephen Hendry turned into a re-spotted black for the first time since John Spencer beat Ray Reardon in the first final in 1975. Hendry had led 9–6, before Williams tied it to 9–9. Williams was then trailing 56–34 in the final frame, when he potted the brown and the remaining colours to tie the scores in the match, after Hendry missed the brown. They then played seven shots on the black in a match similar to the 1985 World Championship final between Dennis Taylor and Steve Davis. Hendry then missed a straight black across the nap in the middle pocket before Williams potted it on the top right pocket to claim his first Masters title.

Field
Defending champion Steve Davis was the number 1 seed with World Champion Ken Doherty seeded 2. Places were allocated to the top 16 players in the world rankings. Players seeded 15 and 16 played in the wild-card round against the winner of the qualifying event, Andy Hicks (ranked 19), and Jimmy White (ranked 21), who was the wild-card selection. Anthony Hamilton and Stephen Lee were making their debuts in the Masters.

Prize fund
The breakdown of prize money for this year is shown below:
Winner: £145,000
Runner-up: £75,000

High Break: £16,000

Total:  £535,000

Wild-card round
In the preliminary round, the wild-card players played the 15th and 16th seeds:

Main draw

Final

Qualifying
Andy Hicks won the qualifying tournament, known as the 1997 Benson & Hedges Championship at the time.

Century breaks 
Total: 20
 142  Andy Hicks
 133, 113, 100  James Wattana
 133  John Higgins
 131, 122, 120, 110  Stephen Hendry
 126  Alain Robidoux
 124  Ronnie O'Sullivan
 119, 112  Nigel Bond
 114  Stephen Lee
 106  Darren Morgan
 104, 100  Steve Davis
 104  Darren Morgan
 100, 100  Mark Williams

Andy Hicks, Stephen Lee and Darren Morgan scored their century breaks in the wild-card round.

References

Masters (snooker)
Masters Snooker
Masters Snooker
February 1998 sports events in the United Kingdom